Major General Donald R. Gardner is a retired United States Marine Corps officer and former president of the Marine Corps University.

Education
Major General Gardner graduated from Memphis State University in 1960 with a Bachelor of Science degree in History and was a member of the Kappa Alpha Order. He also holds a Master of Arts degree in History from Memphis State University. He is a graduate of the Marine Corps Command and Staff College and a distinguished graduate of the Naval War College.

Marine Corps career
Gardner enlisted in the U.S. Marine Corps Reserve in 1955, reaching the rank of sergeant. He was commissioned a second lieutenant in Reserves in 1960 after earning his bachelor's degree.

Command assignments
Major General Gardner's command assignments include: Platoon Commander, 2nd Battalion, 6th Marines (1961); Company Commander, 2nd Reconnaissance Battalion (1963); Company Commander, 3rd Reconnaissance Battalion (1966–67); Commanding Officer, 3rd Battalion, 2nd Marines (1977); Commanding General, Marine Corps Base Camp Lejeune, North Carolina (1988); Commanding General, III Marine Expeditionary Force and Commanding General, Marine Corps Bases, Japan (1992–94); Commanding General, 3rd Marine Division (Rein) (1993).

Staff assignments
Major General Gardner's staff assignments include: Assistant S-3, 2nd Reconnaissance Battalion (1963); Executive Officer, Marine Barracks, Bermuda, British West Indies (1963–66); S-4, 3rd Reconnaissance Battalion (1966); Radio and Television Officer, Division of Information, HQMC, Washington, D.C. (1968); Aide-de-Camp to the Assistant Commandant of the Marine Corps (1970–71); Senior Advisor to Tran Hung Dao 30 (1971); Marine Officer Instructor at Vanderbilt University, Nashville, Tennessee (1973–76); Plans Officer, 2nd Marine Division, Camp Lejeune, N.C (1978–79); Deputy Director, 1st Marine Corps District, Garden City, New York (1982); Director of the 1st Marine Corps District (1984–86); Assistant Chief of Staff, G-3, III Marine Amphibious Force, Okinawa, Laan (1986); Assistant Division Commander, 2nd Marine Division, Camp Lejeune, N.C. (1987–88); Deputy Chief of Staff for Requirements and Programs (1990).

Awards and decorations
Major General Gardner's military awards and personal decorations include: 
 

Foreign Awards

General Gardner was presented the Order of the Rising Sun, Third Class, by the Emperor of Japan for his dedicated service to the security of Japan and the mutual cooperation between Japan and the United States.

Post Marine Corps career
Major General Gardner retired from the U.S. Marine Corps in 1994. From 1996 to 1999, he served as President and Chief Executive Officer of the Intrepid Sea-Air-Space Museum in New York City. From 1999 to 2004, he served as Chief Executive Officer for the Marine Corps University Foundation. 
On May 21, 2004, he was selected to fulfill the duties of President, Marine Corps University, becoming the first civilian to hold the post He retired from that position on June 25, 2009. The guest speaker at his retirement was GEN James T. Conway, Commandant of the Marine Corps, who referred to him as "the last Confederate general still on active duty" due to his research on America's Civil War.
Prior to assuming duties as President, MCU, Major General Gardner had served on the Commonwealth of Virginia's Veterans Services Foundation.  He could not maintain a position as a member of the Veterans Services Foundation, due to federal regulations.

Notes

References

External links

United States Marine Corps generals
United States Marines
People from Tennessee
Recipients of the Navy Distinguished Service Medal
Recipients of the Silver Star
Recipients of the Legion of Merit
Recipients of the Gallantry Cross (Vietnam)
Recipients of the Order of the Rising Sun, 3rd class
Living people
Recipients of the Air Medal
Year of birth missing (living people)